Marcus Vinícius Cesário (born 22 March 1986 in Ribeirão Preto, São Paulo) is a retired Brazilian football centre-back.

Honours
São Paulo's Cup (U 20): 2004
Brazilian League: 2005

External links
 sambafoot
 placar
 Marcus Vinicius Cesario İstanbul BŞB'de
 İstanbul B.B. Cesario ile anlaştı
 Guardian Stats Centre
 Turkish Football Federation profile

1986 births
Living people
Brazilian footballers
Association football defenders
İstanbul Başakşehir F.K. players
Sport Club Corinthians Paulista players
Brazilian expatriate footballers
Brazilian expatriate sportspeople in Turkey
Expatriate footballers in Turkey
Süper Lig players
Footballers from São Paulo (state)